The Samaritans are an ethnoreligious group of the eastern Mediterranean region, originating from connection with ancient Samaria.

Samaritan may also refer to:

Samaritanism
 Samaritanism (Samaritan religion), the religion of Samaritans
 Samaritan Pentateuch (Samaritan Torah), the Samaritan bible
 Samaritan Temple, the church of Samaritans
 Samaritan High Priest (kohen gadol) of the extant Samaritans

Linguistics 
 Samaritan (Unicode block), a block of Unicode characters for writing ancient Hebrew and Aramaic
 Samaritan source (symbol), a typographic symbol indicating original source written with Samaritan script
 Samaritan alphabet
 Samaritan Aramaic language
 Samaritan Hebrew
 Samaritan vocalization

Arts, entertainment, and media

Fictional characters
 Samaritan, a superhero  from the Astro City comic book 
 Samaritan, an antagonistic artificial superintelligence in the television show Person of Interest

Other arts, entertainment, and media
 Samaritan Snare, a 1989 episode of Star Trek: The Next Generation
 Samaritan (novel) is a 2003 novel by Richard Price
 Samaritan demo, a 2011 software demonstration of the Unreal Engine
 The Samaritan, a 2012 film starring Samuel L. Jackson also known as Fury
 Samaritan (film), a 2022 American superhero film

Organizations
 Samaritans (charity) (formerly The Samaritans), a British-based registered charity aimed at providing emotional support to anyone in distress or at risk of suicide
 Samaritan's Purse, a non-denominational evangelical Christian humanitarian organization
 The Samaritan Befrienders Hong Kong, a non-government organization providing similar counseling services in Hong Kong
 Samaritans of Singapore, a non-government organization providing similar counseling services in Singapore
 Good Samaritan Industries, a UnitingCare Australia church agency in Western Australia, which helps find employment for people with disabilities
 Samaritan Foundation Cult, a cult associated with the death of filmmaker Allen Ross

Transportation
 Samaritan Aviation, an airline of Papua New Guinea
 FV104 Samaritan, an ambulance of the CVR(T) family of vehicles in service with the British Army and others
 Convair C-131 Samaritan, U.S. twin-engined military transport plane
 , a U.S. Navy ship name
 , a WWII U.S. Navy hospital ship

Other uses 
 Samaritan Catholic College, a secondary college in the Northern Suburb of Preston, Victoria, Australia
 Samaritan Residential Schools, Elagiri Hills, Tamil Nadu, India

See also 

 The Good Samaritan (disambiguation)
 Bad Samaritans (disambiguation)
 Samaritan Hospital (disambiguation)
 Samaritan Christians
 Samiri (Islamic figure)
 Samaritani